The Orion Autobus is a bus from the Swiss manufacturer "Automobile Factory Orion" from Zurich.

History and technical data 
The Orion buses were built between 1899 and 1903 at the Orion factory at Zurich. They offered 12 seats for passengers. The entrance for the passenger compartment is at the rear. The vehicle is equipped with four solid rubber tires.

In August 1904, an automobile course was set up with Orion buses from the  Aktiengesellschaft für Automobilverkehr im Kanton Zug  from Zug via Hinterburg to Menzingen; An automobile course in the Ägerital was offered, which on 1 November 1905 took over also the post courses. The routes were extended to Zug - Baar - Menzingen and to Zug - Unterägeri - Oberägeri. However, in 1913, the tram canceled the automobile courses because the Orion buses were not yet reliable and with their solid rubber tires on the unpaved road not comfortable - the streetcar promised a quality increase.
An Orion bus was stored in the Swiss Museum of Transport, it was restored by the Orion Club and since 1 April 2000 it has been an exhibit in the Zuger Depot Technikgeschichte.

Data

References
 Der Omnibus «Orion»
 Sandro Sigrist: Elektrische Strassenbahnen im Kanton Zug. Prellbock, Leissigen 1997, 
 Zuger Depot Technikgeschichte

Transport in the canton of Zug